Brocchinia tatei is a species of plant in the genus Brocchinia. This species is native to Venezuela and Guyana.

References

tatei
Flora of Venezuela
Flora of Guyana
Guayana Highlands
Plants described in 1946
Epiphytes